Elimbah is a rural town and locality in the Moreton Bay Region, Queensland, Australia.

Geography
Elimbah is located north of the larger centre of Caboolture, and south of Beerburrum.

Elimbah has the following mountains:

 Round Mountain 
 The Saddleback 
 Tunbubudla (The Twins) 
The Bruce Highway passes from south to north through the locality. Further west, Beerburrum Road also runs through from south to north. Glass House Mountains Road (Steve Irwin Way) passes through the north-east corner. The North Coast railway line also passes from south to north through the locality, roughly parallel to the highway. The town is served by Elimbah railway station.

History
The traditional owners of Elimbah were the Kabi people, who called the area as the "place of the grey water snake".

The town was originally a campsite known as The Six Mile when it became a resting place for horses and bullocks. In 1890, with the breakthrough of the North Coast railway line, it became known as "36miles 68chains". On 20 September 1902, at the urging of local residents, it was officially named Elimbah.

Elimbah State School opened on  3 November 1915.

Twin View State School opened on 4 January 1921 and closed in October 1924. The building was then relocated to Wamuran to be the new school building for Wamuran State School.

The Methodist Church purchased 3 blocks of land in Elimbah in 1913. In 1953, a church was being constructed, with Elimbah Methodist Church opening in 1954. With the amalgamation of the Methodist Church into the Uniting Church in Australia in 1977, it became Elimbah Uniting Church.

The median age of the Elimbah population was 39 years, two years older than the national median. Aboriginal and Torres Strait Islander people made up 3.2% of the population. 80.7% of people were born in Australia. The next most common countries of birth were England 3.9% and New Zealand 3.7%. 90.1% of people spoke only English at home. The most common responses for religion were No Religion 30.6%, Catholic 21.5% and Anglican 17.3%.

Education 
Elimbah State School is a government primary (Prep-6) school for boys and girls at School Road. In 2018, the school had an enrolment of 437 students with 35 teachers (30 full-time equivalent) and 22 non-teaching staff (14 full-time equivalent). It includes a special education program.

There is no secondary school in Elimbah. The nearest government secondary schools are Caboolture State High School and Tullawong State High School, both in neighbouring Caboolture to the south.

Amenities 

Elimbah Uniting Church is at  3 Coronation Drive. It is part of the Moreton Rivers Presbytery of the Uniting Church in Australia.

St Mary Magdalene Orthodox Christian Mission is part of the Antiochian Orthodox Christian Archdiocese of Australia, New Zealand and the Philippines. It meets in the Uniting Church.

References

External links

 
 

localities in Queensland
suburbs of Moreton Bay Region